The Museo de Arte Moderno (Museum of Modern Art) is located in Chapultepec park, Mexico City, Mexico.

The museum is part of the  Instituto Nacional de Bellas Artes y Literatura and provides exhibitions of national and international contemporary artists.  The museum also hosts a permanent collection of art from Remedios Varo, Gelsen Gas, Frida Kahlo, Olga Costa, Diego Rivera, David Alfaro Siqueiros, José Clemente Orozco, Manuel Álvarez Bravo, Leonora Carrington, Rufino Tamayo, Juan Soriano, and Vicente Rojo Almazán.

In 1971 the posthumous retrospective exhibition of Varo drew the largest audiences in its history - larger than those for Rivera and Orozco.

Background 

A forerunner of the MAM, the National Museum of Plastic Arts, was created in 1947 by Carlos Chávez. This first museum was located inside the Palacio de Bellas Artes. However, this museum was more than modest and provisional in part because of the museological conception of modern art since it was considered just one chapter in a broader curatorial script that traversed the history of Mexican art since the pre-Hispanic Mexico/pre-Hispanic times.

Shortly after, in 1953, Carmen Barreda, the then director of the Salon de la Plastica Mexicana and who would later become the first director of the MAM from 1964 to 1972, founded a board with the intention of building an enclosure destined, on purpose, to preserve, study and disseminate the modern art; This project took more than ten years to materialize.

Building 
The building of the Museum of Modern Art of Mexico was based on the design of the architects Pedro Ramírez Vázquez and Carlos A. Cazares Salcido (Professor at the University of Sonora), in collaboration with Rafael Mijares Alcérreca. A part of the original project, which included an auditorium, library and wineries, was never completed.

The design of the gardens and walkways corresponds to Juan Siles, with the direction of the artist Helen Escobedo.

Collections 

The museum focuses on displaying modern Mexican art, mainly from the decade of 1930 onwards. Within its permanent exhibition are works of several great Mexican masters of the period, such as: Frida Kahlo, Julio Castellanos, David Alfaro Siqueiros, Emir Jair, Roberto Montenegro, José Clemente Orozco, Louis Henri Jean Charlot, Juan Soriano, Juan O'Gorman, Diego Rivera, Jesús Guerrero Galván, María Izquierdo, Rufino Tamayo, Raúl Anguiano, Federico Cantú, Carlos Orozco Romero, Manuel Rodríguez Lozano, Ricardo Martínez de Hoyos, Jorge González Camarena, Guillermo Meza, Francisco Corzas, Leonora Carrington, Alfredo Zalce, Remedios Varo, Agustín Lazo, Ángel Zárraga, Gerardo Murillo, José Chávez Morado, Mathías Goeritz, Gunther Gerzso, Manuel Felguérez, Abraham Ángel, Pedro Coronel, Luis López Loza, Francisco Toledo, Francisco Zúñiga, Pedro Friedeberg, Luis Ortiz Monasterio, Feliciano Béjar, Rosa Castillo y Mardonio Magaña. Like other Mexican art museums, the MAM has a very wide collection of modern and contemporary Mexican art, which by limitations of physical space is known by means of temporary exhibitions.

The museum's lobby and gardens are adorned with sculptures by great national and international artists. Among nationals represented are Gelsen Gas, Germán Cueto, Mathias Goeritz, Estanislao Contreras and Manuel Felguérez.

The theme of the museum mainly covers what is known as the Escuela Mexicana de Pintura and the Generación de la Ruptura. Exhibitions of international contemporary art are also presented.

The museum has under its shelter an important collection of works by the great Mexican photographer Manuel Álvarez Bravo.

Rooms 

The museum has four rooms that are named after different personalities of the Mexican cultural environment of the twentieth century: Xavier Villaurrutia, Carlos Pellicer, Antonieta Rivas Mercado, and José Juan Tablada. It also features the Fernando Gamboa Gallery.

The museum's permanent collection is on display in room "C" of the main building, on the first floor.

Gallery

References

External links 

 Museo de Art Moderno *
 Instituto Nacional de Bellas Artes *

Museo de Arte Moderno
Art museums and galleries in Mexico
Art museums established in 1964
Chapultepec
Modern art museums
Museums in Mexico City
Museo de Arte Moderno
Museo de Arte Moderno